Mount Pelops is a  mountain summit located in the Tantalus Range, in Tantalus Provincial Park, in southwestern British Columbia, Canada. Precipitation runoff from the peak drains into tributaries of the Squamish River. The first ascent of the mountain was made in 1916 by Tom Fyles and his brother, John Fyles. The mountain was named for Pelops, brother of Niobe and son of Tantalus according to Greek mythology, with several peaks in the Tantalus Range being named for family members of Tantalus. The mountain's name was officially adopted on June 6, 1957, by the Geographical Names Board of Canada.

Climate

Based on the Köppen climate classification, Mount Pelops is located in the marine west coast climate zone of western North America. Most weather fronts originate in the Pacific Ocean, and travel east toward the Coast Mountains where they are forced upward by the range (Orographic lift), causing them to drop their moisture in the form of rain or snowfall. As a result, the Coast Mountains experience high precipitation, especially during the winter months in the form of snowfall. Winter temperatures can drop below −20 °C with wind chill factors below −30 °C. This climate supports small glacier remnants on the east and north slopes of Pelops. The months July through September offer the most favorable weather for climbing Pelops.

Climbing Routes
 
Established rock climbing routes on Mount Pelops:

 North Side - 
 Southeast Ridge -   
 East Face -  First ascent in 1962

See also

 Geography of British Columbia
 Geology of British Columbia

References

External links
 Weather: Mount Pelops

Pelops
Pacific Ranges
Sea-to-Sky Corridor
New Westminster Land District